Gościsław is a village in the administrative district of Gmina Udanin, within Środa Śląska County, Lower Silesian Voivodeship, in south-western Poland.

The village has an approximate population of 350.

References

Villages in Środa Śląska County